Hibrildes is a genus of moths in the family Eupterotidae.

Species
 Hibrildes crawshayi Butler, 1896
 Hibrildes norax Druce, 1888

Former species
 Hibrildes venosa Kirby, 1896

References

Hibrildinae
Moth genera